Vilathikulam is a selection grade panchayat town in Thoothukudi district in the Indian state of Tamil Nadu. It is a small town near the southern tip of mainland India.

Vilathikulam is a little town, on the northern bank of the Vaipar river, which has water flowing only 15 to 25 days per year. It had major issue as the bridge connecting the Vilathikulam town on the southern side to the Kovilpatti and Tuticorin routes gets submerged completely when the river flows. It is a single lane bridge constructed during the British Era and is about 1.5 km in length. In year 2012, new double-way Bridge was constructed adjacent to the old bridge to avoid roads from getting submerged.

As the panacea of water problem a dam has been constructed across Vaipar in 2006.

Etymology
Vilathikulam owes its name to a temple pond "Vila" + "Athi" + "Kulam". The Meenakshi Amman Temple has a temple pond, which had a "Vila" tree and an "Athi" tree and hence, the name. Every year during Chithirai month, ( same day and dates as of  Madurai Meenakshi amman Temple), Chithirai Festival is celebrated and ends with a Car Festival crowded by the people from nearby villages.

Demographics
 India census, Vilathikulam had a population of 13,540. Males constitute 50% of the population and females 50%. Vilathikulam has an average literacy rate of 72%, higher than the national average of 59.5%: male literacy is 77%, and female literacy is 67%. In Vilathikulam, 12% of the population is under 6 years of age.

Entertainment
"Sithirai Thiruvizha" in Meenakshi Amman temple is the most famous festival in Vilathikulam which will last for more than 10 days. Another big entertainment for the people in and around Vilathikulam is the famous "Rekla Race" (bull cart race), which happens usually for most festivals and functions. The people in and around Vilathikulam will host the "Rekla Race" and people from all over Tamil Nadu participate with their trained bulls.

Purana Nadagam (Stage shows) like "Arichantra Mayana Kandam", "Veera Pandiya Katta Pomman", "Valli Thirumanam", "Pavalak kodi"  are arranged every year during the "pongal" festival at the Amman temple at Karisalkulam, Velidupatti, Singilipatti, Perilovanpatti, Lakshmi Puram and also some nearby villages. Other events at such festivals include Karakaattam, Narikurathi aattam, etc.

"Pathirakali Amman" temple festivals like "Silampattom" and "Mulaippari" are other major religious events in the region.

Railway Projects
The Vilathikulam people's major expectation is that the proposed Railway line connecting Madurai with Tuticorin through Vilathikulam, Pudur, Pandalkudi and Aruppukottai, should bring in more developments to the region. The project is confirmed and now started.

Politics
Vilathikulam assembly constituency is part of Thoothukudi (Lok Sabha constituency).

Villages
(Idaichiyoorani)

Attankarai
A.Kumarapuram
A.Kumarapuram(Bharvathi Nagar)
 A.Subrahmanyapuram
 Ayan Vadamalapuram-Achankulam 
 Ariyanayagipuram
 Arungulam
 Ayan Sengalpadai
 Ayanbommiahpuram (PanayadiPatti)
 Bhutalapuram
 Bommayyapuram
 Chittayanayakkanpatti
 E.Velayudhapuram
 Elanthaikulam
 Guruvarpatti
 K.Duraiswamipuram
 K.Kumaraettaiyapuram
 K.Tangammalpuram
K.Subramaniyapuram
 Kadalkudi
 Kalloorani
 Kamalapuram 
 Kammapatti
 Kandaswamypuram
 Kannimarkuttam
 Karisalkulam
 Kavundanpatti
 Kilvilathikulam
 Kodangipatti
 Kottanatham
 Kulakkattankurichi
 [Kulathur South]
 Kulattur(East)
 Kumarachittanpatti
 Kumaragiri
 Kumaralingapuram
 Kumarasakkanapuram
 Kunchaiya puram
 Kuralaiyampatti
 K.sundareswarapuram
 Lakshmipuram
 M.Kumarasakkanapuram
 M.Shanmukhapuram
 Madalapuram
 Madarajapuram
 Malliswarapuram
 Mandikkulam
 Maniyakaranpatti
 Mamunainarpuram
 Marthandampatti
 Maryarkudichattram
 Mavilodai
 Melkallurani
 Melmandai
 Metilpati
 Muthaiyapuram
 Muthusamypuram
 N.Jagavirapuram
 Nadukattur
NAGALAPURAM
 Namasivayapuram
 Nedungulam
 Pallakulam
 P.Jagavirapuram
 Pattithevanpatti
 Periasamipuram
 Pudur
 Puliyangulam
 Pusanur
 Ramachandrapuram
 Sakkammalpuram
 Sallichettipatti
 Sankaralingapuram
 Senraya puram
 sundarapachaiya puram
 sennamareddi patti
 Sennampatti
 chinnavanaickenpatti
 Sinnur
 Sivagnanapuram
 Sivalarpatti
 T.Subbiahpuram
 Sundaranachchayyapuram
 Surangudi
 Tattaneri
 Vaippar-Nd
 Vaippar-St
 Vannipatti
 Vathalakarai
 Vauvaltotti
 Vedapatti
 Velidupatti
 Velliyammalpuram
 Vembar
 Venkteswarapuram
 Vilathikulam
 Vilvamarathupatti
 Virapandiapuram
 Vallinayagapuram 
 Ayan Virisampatti
 Zaminkarisalkulam
 Vallinayakapuram
 Pattiyur
 Uttchinatham
 Sevalpatti
 Reguramapuarm
 Pudupatti
 Vowalthoti
 Thathaneri
 LeggenPatti

Education
Schools
 Government Higher Secondary School 
 TNDTA Middle School
 Sharon Matriculation Higher Secondary School
 Ambal Vidhyalaya (CBSE)
 Kaviyarasar Annamalai Reddiyar Girls Higher Secondary School

Professional training Institutes

 Diplomas in nursing and catering offered by "Irin Raja Institute of Vocational Education"

References

 Kulathur South

External links
 About Tamilnadu other places

Thoothukudi